Delvin Pérez Dippini (born November 24, 1998) is a Puerto Rican professional baseball infielder in the New York Yankees organization.

Career

Amateur career
Pérez attended the International Baseball Academy in Puerto Rico. He started playing shortstop at 14–15 years old after starting out as a pitcher. During the fall of 2015 he played in the World Wood Bat Association World Championship in Jupiter, Florida.

Pérez was considered one of the top prospects for the 2016 Major League Baseball draft, being compared to Carlos Correa. Leading up to the draft he received help from former MLB player Carlos Delgado. Prior to the 2016 MLB draft, Pérez won the Most Valuable Player award in the Víctor Pellot Excellence Tournament, guiding his team to the championship by batting .556 (including several extra-base hits) and leading the tournament in RBIs and runs scored before the highest ranked prospects in Puerto Rico.

On the first day of the draft, media reports claimed that Pérez had failed a drug test for performance enhancing drugs (PEDs). His agent, Melvin Román, was vocal in denouncing the news as gossip and insisted that his client had not failed any tests. Pérez was selected 23rd overall in the first round by the St. Louis Cardinals in the draft.

Professional career

St. Louis Cardinals
After signing, Pérez made his professional debut with the Rookie-level Gulf Coast League Cardinals where he batted .294 with a .745 OPS and 12 stolen bases. In 2017, Pérez began the season with the Johnson City Cardinals of the Rookie-level Appalachian League. However, after slashing only .140/.275/.186 in 13 games, he was demoted back to the Gulf Coast League. He returned to Johnson City in late July. In 34 total games between both clubs, he batted .203 with nine RBIs and five stolen bases. He spent 2018 with the State College Spikes of the Class A Short Season New York–Penn League, batting .213 with one home run, 21 RBIs, and eight stolen bases over 64 games. Pérez spent 2019 with the Peoria Chiefs of the Class A Midwest League, with whom he was named an All-Star. Over 118 games, he slashed .269/.329/.325 with one home run, thirty RBIs, and 22 stolen bases.

Over the 2020-21 offseason, Pérez gained over twenty pounds and changed his diet, attributing his struggles throughout his professional career to his "skinny" figure. He spent the 2021 season with the Springfield Cardinals of the Double-A Central, slashing .265/.322/.339 with four home runs, 23 RBIs, and 24 stolen bases over 98 games. He returned to Springfield to begin the 2022 season. He elected free agency on November 10, 2022.

New York Yankees
On January 5, 2023, Perez signed a minor league deal with the New York Yankees.

References

External links

1998 births
Living people
Sportspeople from San Juan, Puerto Rico
Puerto Rican baseball players
Baseball shortstops
Gulf Coast Cardinals players
Johnson City Cardinals players
State College Spikes players
Peoria Chiefs players